WOKV may refer to:
WOKV (AM) 690 in Jacksonville, Florida
WOKV-FM 104.5 in Jacksonville, Florida
WGRR or WOKV (1978–1981), 103.5 MHz in Hamilton, Ohio
WBOB (AM) or WOKV (1981–1991) 600 kHz in Jacksonville, Florida
WMUV or WOKV (1991–1992) 100.7 MHz in Brunswick, Georgia
WXXJ (FM) or WOKV (2006–2013) 106.5 MHz in Ponte Vedra Beach, Florida